William Laird was a Scottish professional footballer who played as a forward for Sunderland.

References

Sportspeople from Larkhall
Scottish footballers
Association football forwards
Blantyre Celtic F.C. players
Sunderland A.F.C. players
Gateshead F.C. players
English Football League players
Year of birth missing
Footballers from South Lanarkshire